The 1978–79 FC Bayern Munich season was the club's 14th season in Bundesliga.

Competitions

Bundesliga

DFB-Pokal

References

FC Bayern Munich seasons
Bayern